The Snowdonia Way is an  long-distance footpath in Snowdonia, Wales from Machynlleth in the south to Conwy in the north. The main route is the only long-distance low-level route through Snowdonia, avoiding the peaks in favour of valley tracks, hillside paths, and Roman roads. The mountain variant instead climbs the famous peaks of the park.

References

External links
 
 The Long Distance Walkers Association

Long-distance footpaths in England